John Charles (born 21 September 1942) is  a former Australian rules footballer who played with Footscray in the Victorian Football League (VFL).

Notes

External links 		
		
		
						

1942 births
Living people
Australian rules footballers from Victoria (Australia)		
Western Bulldogs players